Jaylon Moore may refer to:

Jaylon Moore (offensive lineman) (born 1998), American football player
Jaylon Moore (wide receiver) (born 1997), American football player